Thomas Sutherland (born 17 February 1880 in England; date of death unknown) was an English first-class cricketer. Sutherland was a right-handed batsman who bowled right-arm fast.

Sutherland made his first-class debut for Hampshire against the Warwickshire in the 1898 County Championship, where on debut Sutherland took his maiden and only five wicket haul, which gave him career best figures of 6/111.

Sutherland represented Hampshire in nine first-class matches between 1898 and 1899. Sutherland made his highest first-class score of 21 against Leicestershire in 1899. Sutherland played his final first-class match for Hampshire against Surrey. Despite his bowling success in his first match against Warwickshire, Sutherland took only another five wickets in eight more first-class matches. His career tally was eleven wickets at a bowling average of 40.54.

Sutherland's date and place of death is currently unknown.

External links
Thomas Sutherland at Cricinfo
Thomas Sutherland at CricketArchive

1880 births
English cricketers
Hampshire cricketers
Year of death missing